Austroargiolestes calcaris is a species of Australian damselfly in the family Megapodagrionidae,
commonly known as a powdered flatwing. 
It is endemic to south-eastern Australia, where it inhabits streams, deep pools and bogs, generally in mountainous areas.

Austroargiolestes calcaris is a medium-sized to large, black and pale yellow damselfly, strongly pruinescent when mature.
Like other members of the family Megapodagrionidae it rests with its wings outspread.

Austroargiolestes calcaris appears similar to Austroargiolestes isabellae, which is found in the Sydney Basin.

Gallery

See also
 List of Odonata species of Australia

References 

Megapodagrionidae
Odonata of Australia
Insects of Australia
Endemic fauna of Australia
Taxa named by Frederic Charles Fraser
Insects described in 1958
Damselflies